Union Cemetery is a historic cemetery on Olentangy River Road near Riverside Methodist Hospital in Columbus, Ohio. Owing to its location near the Ohio State University, it has been the chosen resting place for numerous Buckeye luminaries and Columbus politicians.

History 
Balser Hess, a veteran of the American Revolutionary War, established a farm on the site in the early 19th century. Hess is thought to be the first burial there, in 1806. It was established as a public cemetery in 1847.

The cemetery lies just east of State Route 315, and is responsible for that highway's infamous "hospital curve." The Ohio Department of Transportation had sought for years to seize cemetery land for the road, but the Supreme Court of Ohio sided with the cemetery. Eventually a compromise was reached resulting in a short east–west leg of the route running between the cemetery to the south and Riverside Hospital to the north.

Notable burials
Notable individuals buried at the cemetery include:
 Myron B. Gessaman, Mayor of Columbus
 Hank Gowdy, Professional baseball player for New York Giants and Boston Braves
 Chic Harley, Ohio State football player
 Woody Hayes, Ohio State football coach
 Paul M. Herbert, Three-time Lieutenant Governors of Ohio, Ohio Supreme Court Justice
 Arthur G. James, Surgeon, founder of The James Cancer Hospital
 Benny Kauff, Professional baseball player for New York Giants
 Hank Marr Jazz Musician
 Joel Parsons, Civil War recipient of the Medal of Honor
 Buck Rinehart, Mayor of Columbus
 Lynn St. John, Ohio State basketball coach
 Fred Taylor, Ohio State basketball player and coach
 Dave Thomas, Founder of Wendy's
Nathan A. McCoy, United States Postmaster at Columbus, Ohio

References

External links
 
 
 

Cemeteries in Columbus, Ohio